Growing Up in Public is the second album by English actor and singer Jimmy Nail, released in 1992 on the Warner Music UK label. It was produced by Nail, Guy Pratt and Danny Schogger and includes the single "Ain't No Doubt", a UK chart topper for three weeks in July 1992. Three further singles were released, of which only "Laura" charted, at #58. Growing Up in Public reached #2 on the UK Albums Chart.

Contributors to the album include George Harrison, Gary Moore, David Gilmour and Sam Brown.

Track listing 
Tracks 1–4 written by Guy Pratt, Danny Schogger, Jimmy Nail, Charlie DoreTracks 5–10 written by Pratt, Schogger, Nail
 "Ain't No Doubt" – 4:09
 "Reach Out" – 3:40
 "Laura" – 4:25
 "Waiting For the Sunshine" – 4:20
 "Real Love" – 4:33
 "Only Love (Can Bring Us Home)" – 5:46
 "Wicked World" – 4:33
 "Beautiful" – 4:40
 "I Believed" – 4:26
 "Absent Friends" – 4:11

Singles 
 "Ain't No Doubt" (UK #1)
 "Laura" (UK #58)
 "Beautiful"
 "Only Love (Can Bring Us Home)"

Personnel 
 Jimmy Nail – vocals
 Guy Pratt – bass guitar, backing vocals
 Danny Schogger – keyboards
 Elliott Randall, David Gilmour, George Harrison, Gary Moore – guitar
 Sylvia Mason-James, Katie Kissoon, Sam Brown, Linda Taylor, Andy Caine – backing vocals
 Steve Sidwell, Ned Sidwell, Steve Gregory, Stuart Brook, Nigel Hitchcock, Martin Dobson – brass
 Kate St John – oboe
 Kevin Healy – Spanish guitar
 Gary Wallis, Marc Fox, Graham Ward, Neil Conti – percussion

Charts

References

Jimmy Nail albums
1992 albums
Warner Records albums